The Borehamwood & Elstree Times is a local newspaper circulated in Elstree and Borehamwood, Hertfordshire, England. It is owned by the Newsquest Media Group and part of the north London Times series.

References

External links
 

Newspapers published by Newsquest
Newspapers published in Hertfordshire
Borehamwood